This is a list of companies operating in West Bank settlements, compiled by the UN Human Rights Council and published by the UN Office for the Coordination of Humanitarian Affairs (OCHA). Israeli settlements in the occupied territory of the West Bank, including East Jerusalem, are considered illegal under international law.

The report was requested by Human Rights Council resolution 31/36 in follow up to the International Fact-Finding Mission on Israeli Settlements, a 2013 investigation into the impact of Israeli settlements on Palestinian rights in the occupied territories, and listed ten activities of concern, including the supply of construction equipment, materials, services and utilities to settlements, and to erect the West Bank wall; financial support for settlement activities; and, the supply of demolition equipment used to destroy property and agricultural assets.

There are 112 business entities on the list for which, based on "a thorough review and assessment of all information available", there was considered "reasonable grounds to conclude, had been involved in one or more of those activities".

The list includes mostly Israeli companies, but also includes prominent international firms, such as the US-based travel companies Airbnb, Booking.com, Expedia and TripAdvisor, US tech company Motorola Solutions, France’s Egis Rail and the British construction equipment manufacturer JCB. Of the entities listed, 94 are domiciled in Israel, and 18 in six other states: the United States (6), the Netherlands (4), the UK (3), France (3), Luxembourg (1) and Thailand (1).

In its report, the UN Human Rights Council noted that the companies flagged by the list were all responsible for  activities that “raised particular human rights concerns”. Michelle Bachelet, the UN High Commissioner for Human Rights, said the report was not a “blacklist”, while her office noted that it “does not provide a legal characterization of the activities in question, or of business enterprises’ involvement in them.”

On 5 July 2021, Norway’s largest pension fund KLP, said it has divested itself of 16 companies that appeared on the list saying "There is an unacceptable risk that the excluded companies will contribute to the violation of human rights in war and conflict situations through their connection to the Israeli settlements in the occupied West Bank".

List of companies operating in West Bank settlements

Below are the 112 companies operating in West Bank settlements, and their home countries, as listed in the report:

A) Business enterprises involved in listed activities

International firms

Israeli firms

B) Business enterprises involved as parent companies

International firms

Israeli firms

References

International trade-related lists
Israeli–Palestinian conflict
Israeli settlement
Israeli–Palestinian conflict-related lists